Change or Changing may refer to:

Alteration
 Impermanence, a difference in a state of affairs at different points in time
 Menopause, also referred to as "the change", the permanent cessation of the menstrual period
 Metamorphosis, or change, a biological process by which an animal physically develops after birth or hatching
 Personal development, or personal change, activities that improve awareness and identity
 Social change, an alteration in the social order of a society
 Technological change, invention, innovation, and diffusion of technology

Organizations and politics
 Change 2011, a Finnish political party
 Change We Need, a slogan for Barack Obama's 2008 presidential campaign
 Change.gov, the transition website for the incoming Obama administration in 2008–2009
 Change.org, a petition website operated by Change.org, Inc.
 Communities Helping All Neighbors Gain Empowerment (CHANGE), a civic organization based in Winston-Salem, North Carolina
 Movement for Change, an Iraqi Kurdish political party

Places
 Change, Nepal
 Change, Saône-et-Loire, France
 Change Islands, Newfoundland and Labrador
 Le Change, Dordogne, France

Science and philosophy
 Fold change, in statistics
 Relative change, in quantitative sciences
 Change (philosophy)

Art, entertainment, and media

Literature
 I Ching, a Chinese classic text also known as the Classic of Changes, and Book of Changes
 The Change (Animorphs), a book in the Animorphs series, written by K.A. Applegate

Music

Groups
 Change (band), an Italian-American post-disco group active in the 1980s
 The Change (band), a former band associated with English duo Myles and Connor
 The Changes (band), an American rock band
 Jimmy and the Soulblazers a.k.a. Change, an American R&B group active in the 1970s

Albums
Change (The Alarm album), 1989
 Change (Vanessa Amorosi album), 2002
 Change (Jason Chan album), 2008
 Change (Chick Corea album), 1999
 Change (The Dismemberment Plan album), 2001
 Change (Every Little Thing album), 2010
 Change (Andrew Hill album), 2007
 Change (Derrick Hoh album), 2010
 Change (Richie Kotzen album), 2003
 Change (Pink Cream 69 album), 1995
 Change (Sons of the Desert album), 2000
 Change (Sugababes album), 2007
 Change (Cindy Wilson album), 2017
Change by Barry White, 1982
 Change (Ray Wilson album), 2003
 Change, by Bakithi Kumalo
 Change!, by the Black Swans
 Changed (album), an album by Rascal Flatts
 Changes (disambiguation)#Albums
 The Change (album), an album by Marie Fredriksson

Songs
 "Change" (Charlie Puth song)
 "Change" (Christina Aguilera song)
 "Change" (Daniel Merriweather song)
 "Change" (Every Little Thing song)
 "Change" (Hotel FM song)
 "Change" (Hyuna song)
 "Change" (John Waite song)
 "Change" (Killing Joke song)
 "Change" (Kimberley Locke song)
 "Change" (Lisa Stansfield song)
 "Change" (Miho Fukuhara song)
 "Change" (Miwa song)
 "Change" (Pale Waves song)
 "Change" (Sugababes song)
 "Change" (Taylor Swift song)
 "Change" (Tears for Fears song)
 "Change", by Axium from Matter of Time
 "Change", by Banks from Goddess
 "Changed", by Bazzi from Cosmic
 "Change", by Black Stone Cherry from Between the Devil & the Deep Blue Sea
 "Change", by Blind Melon from Blind Melon
 "Change", by Bobby Darin from Bobby Darin Born Walden Robert Cassotto
 "Change", by Carrie Underwood from Play On
 "Change", by Churchill
 "Change", by Conor & Jay from the Grand Theft Auto III soundtrack
 "Change", by Crazy Town from Darkhorse
 "Change", by Fishbone from Truth and Soul
 "Change", by Lana Del Rey from Lust for Life
 "Change", by Jeff Liu and Rebecca Sugar, in Steven Universe: The Movie
 "Change", by Joy, 2018
 "Change", by Ken Carson from Project X
 "Change", by the Lightning Seeds from Jollification
 "Change", by Oingo Boingo from Boingo
 "Change", by RM, featuring Wale
 "Change", by Salvador Sobral from Excuse Me
 "Change", by Sean Kingston from Sean Kingston
 "Change", by Sparks from Music That You Can Dance To
 "Change", by Staind from Break the Cycle
 "Change", by Tess Gaerthé
 "Change", by T-Pain from Three Ringz
 "Change", by Tracy Chapman from Where You Live
 "Change", by White Lies from Big TV
 "Change (In the House of Flies)", by Deftones
 "Change (Part 1)", by Australian band Karnivool from the album Themata
 "Change (Part 2)", by Australian band Karnivool from the album Sound Awake
 "Changed", by Polvo from Siberia
 "Changed" (song), by Rascal Flatts
 "Changing" (Conrad Sewell song), 2018
 "Changing" (Sigma song), 2011
 "Changing", by a Airborne Toxic Event from All at Once 
 "Changing", by Jimmy Ellis, 1973
 "Changing", by Magic featuring Tony Burrows, 1976
 "Changing", by Marilyn Michaels, 1987
 "Changing", by The Searchers, 1980
 "Changing", by Silver Sun, 1996
 "Changing", by Sunnyboys, 1989
 "Changing", by Touch, 1974
 "The Change" (song), by Garth Brooks
 "The Change", by What So Not and DMA's, 2021

Television
 Change (Armenian TV series), a 2016 Armenian sitcom
 Change (Japanese TV series), a 2008 Japanese television drama
 "Changing" (Supergirl), a season 2 episode of the TV series
The Change, an alternative name for The Emberverse series as well as a fictional event in that series

Other uses in arts, entertainment, and media
 Change (film), a 2010 Italian film
 Change: The Magazine of Higher Learning, a journal published for the Carnegie Foundation for the Advancement of Teaching by Heldref Publications
 The Change (radio show), a British radio programme

Other uses
Coins, also referred to as change or pocket change

See also

 Becoming (philosophy)
 Chang'e (disambiguation)
 Changer (disambiguation)
 Changes (disambiguation)
 Chump Change (disambiguation) 
 Small change (disambiguation)
 Variation (disambiguation)
 Transition (disambiguation), broadly synonymous in many spheres